

List

References

C